Putkonen is a Finnish surname. Notable people with the surname include:

 Luke Putkonen (born 1986), American baseball player
 Matias Putkonen (1822–1868), Finnish Lutheran priest and politician
 Tahvo Putkonen (1795–1825), Finnish murderer

Finnish-language surnames